Nyasvizh or Nesvizh is a city in Minsk Region, Belarus. It is the administrative centre of Nyasvizh District. Nyasvizh is the site of Nesvizh Castle, a World Heritage Site. As of 2009, its population was 14,300.

History

Nesvizh was first documented in 1223. It was part of the Grand Duchy of Lithuania until 1793, but the Grand Duchy was part of the Polish–Lithuanian Commonwealth since 1569. In the 15th century, while still a minor town, it belonged to the Kiszka family and later to the Radziwiłł family, and remained the family's seat until 1813.

In 1561 or 1562 Maciej Kawęczyński founded the print works of the Polish Brethren. The first Belarusian language book printed in Latin script, a catechism by Symon Budny, was published in Nesvizh in 1562. The Nieśwież Bible (Biblia nieświeska), one of the oldest Polish translations of the Bible, also by Budny, was completed there in 1571 and published in 1572.

Nesvizh Castle was erected in 1583, and between 1584 and 1598 the Benedictines and Jesuit religious orders founded monasteries and a college. At the request of Mikołaj "the Orphan" Radziwiłł Nieśwież was granted Magdeburg town rights by King Stephen Báthory in 1586. Two epidemics affected the city early in the 17th century which led to the establishment of a pharmacy in 1627.

During the Great Northern War of 1700–21, the city was significantly damaged by Swedish troops. It was rebuilt in the 1720s by Michał "Rybeńko" Radziwiłł. In the aftermath of the war, in 1740s and 1750s he founded a Pas slucki factory which was later moved to Sluck. He introduced a military school, several textile factories and restored the Corpus Christi Church and opened a print works. Michał's wife, Franciszka Urszula Radziwiłłowa, founded the Nieśwież Radziwiłł Theatre, including a choir and a ballet school.

Between 1764 and 1768 the city was occupied by Russian troops, and in 1772, at the First Partition of Lithuania-Poland, the library, which comprised circa 10,000 volumes, along with paintings and other art objects, was seized and transferred to St. Petersburg. Some books from the library were passed to the Russian Academy of Sciences.

After the Second partition of Lithuania-Poland in 1793, Nieśwież was annexed by Russia, and renamed Nesvizh. In 1906, the Polish Society "Oświata" ("Education") in Nesvizh was established, but its activities were hampered by the Russian administration, before banning it at the start of 1910. In 1912 the Russian authorities also liquidated the Roman Catholic Charity Society in Nesvizh.

After the fall of tsarist Russia, fighting broke out for control over the city and surrounding region. The city came under Soviet rule in early 1919 (Polish–Soviet War), the unsuccessful Nieśwież uprising by Polish residents took place during March 14–19, 1919. Nevertheless, Nieśwież was captured by the Poles on April 19, 1919, and was integrated into the reestablished Polish state. It was became a powiat in the Nowogródek Voivodeship until the Soviet invasion of Poland in September 1939. During World War II it was part of the Byelorussian Soviet Socialist Republic from 1939 to 1941, but was occupied from 1941 to 1944 by the Germans in accordance with Operation Barbarossa. The town was liberated during Operation Bagration in 1944. Nyasvizh's status as part of the Byelorussian Soviet Socialist Republic was solidified in accordance with the Potsdam Agreement.

The Jews of Nesvizh
The Jewish population in 1900 stood at 4,687, and approx. 4,500 on the eve of the German invasion, Operation Barbarossa. With the occupation from June 27, 1941, a Judenrat was established. On October 30, 4,000 of the town's Jews were murdered and the rest confined to a ghetto. On July 20, 1942, the ghetto was surrounded by Belorussian police and the German commander announced that the ghetto's population would be liquidated with the exception of 30 essential skilled workers. The ghetto's underground organization, based on a Soviet-era Zionist group, called an uprising armed only with one machine gun, small arms but mostly knives. Most of the Jews were killed. A few escaped to nearby forests and joined partisan units, such as the Zhukov Jewish partisan unit.

Demography

Main sights
 Nesvizh Castle, the family complex of the Radziwiłł family, is a World Heritage Site.
 The Corpus Christi Church, built between 1587 and 1593, is one of the earliest Jesuit churches in the world and one of the first baroque buildings in the Polish–Lithuanian Commonwealth. It came to influence the later architecture of present-day Belarus, Poland and of Lithuania. It contains the tombs of the Radziwiłł family.
 Slutsk Gate, a city gate constructed around 1700. Its name refers to the city of Slutsk.
 Baroque Town Hall and cloth hall
 Baroque Benedictine monastery
 Baroque Craftsman House from 1721, formerly known as the Gdansk House, named after the city of Gdańsk

International relations

Nyasvizh is twinned with:

 Biržai, Lithuania
 Boyarka, Ukraine
 Carmel, Israel
 Gatchinsky District, Russia
 Goris, Armenia
 İsmayıllı, Azerbaijan
 Markivka Raion, Ukraine
 Odolanów, Poland
 Puławy, Poland
 Radviliškis, Lithuania
 Reutov, Russia
 Rosolini, Italy
 Silivri, Turkey
 Starobilsk Raion, Ukraine
 Zemun (Belgrade), Serbia
 Złotów, Poland

Notable residents
 Karol Stanisław Radziwiłł,  Lithuanian, Polish nobleman and politician
 Michael Goleniewski, Polish spy
 Piotr Jaroszewicz, Polish politician
 Michał Vituška, Belarusian leader of the Black Cats

References

External links 

 Official web page of Parish of «Corpus Christi» in Niasvizh
 Church of the Corpus Christi
 Gates of Sluck
 Nesvizh Regional Executive Committee 
 Jurkau kutoczak — Юркаў куточак — Yury's Corner. Старажытнае дойлідства Нясьвіжа 
 Monuments of Nesvizh
 Photos on Radzima.org
 History and sightseeing on belarustourism.by
 The murder of the Jews of Nesvizh during World War II, at Yad Vashem website.
 About the Jewish community of Nesvizh, at Yad Vashem website.
 

Cities in Belarus
Populated places in Minsk Region
Nyasvizh District
Slutsky Uyezd
Nowogródek Voivodeship (1919–1939)
Nowogródek Voivodeship (1507–1795)
 
Holocaust locations in Belarus